Henry Anderson (1545 – 1605) was an English landowner and politician who was elected to represent Newcastle-upon-Tyne once as Sheriff, three times as Mayor, and four times as MP in the House of Commons between 1584 and 1593 and was also Sheriff of Northumberland.

Background 
Anderson was the eldest son of Bertram Anderson (d.1571) and his wife, Alice Carr, the daughter of Robert Carr of Newcastle-upon-Tyne. He was educated at St John's College, Cambridge and Gray's Inn.

Career 
Anderson was Sheriff (1571–2), Alderman (1575) and Mayor of Newcastle-upon-Tyne (1575–6, 1583–4, 1594–5). Justice of the Peace for Northumberland (from 1577), he was later High Sheriff of Northumberland (1586–7) and Justice of the Peace for County Durham (from 1584). Elected to parliament for Newcastle-upon-Tyne, he attended the Parliaments of 1584, 1586, 1588, and 1593. He resided at Haswell, County Durham. He died at the beginning of August 1605 and was buried at Pittington, County Durham.

Family 
Anderson married Isabella Morland (d.1582), the daughter of Christopher Morland of Pittington, County Durham. They had four daughters. Anderson's second marriage to Fortune Collingwood, the daughter of Sir Cuthbert Collingwood of Eslington, Northumberland produced a further nine children, including the Royalist Sir Henry Anderson (1582–1659).

Arms

Ancestry

References 

1545 births
1605 deaths
Anderson family of Newcastle-upon-Tyne
English MPs 1584–1585
English MPs 1586–1587
English MPs 1593
High Sheriffs of Northumberland
English MPs 1589
Politicians from Newcastle upon Tyne
People from Haswell, County Durham